Kanu or KANU may refer to:

People
Kanú (footballer, born 1983), full name Elias de Oliveira Rosa, Brazilian footballer
Kanu (footballer, born 1984), full name António Eduardo Pereira dos Santos, Brazilian footballer 
Kanu (footballer, born 1987), full name Rubenilson dos Santos da Rocha, Brazilian footballer
Kanú (footballer, born 1992), full name Alexandre Valério, Brazilian footballer
Christopher Kanu (born 1979), Nigerian footballer
Mohamed Kanu (born 1968), Sierra Leonean footballer
Nwankwo Kanu (born 1976), Nigerian footballer
Hal Robson-Kanu (born 1989), Welsh footballer

Other uses

Kanu is a name of God meaning handsome
KANU (FM), a radio station in Lawrence, Kansas, United States
Kanu (play), a kabuki play
Kenya African National Union, a political party

Surnames of African origin